Crveni Krst ("Red Cross") is a neighborhood of the city of Niš, Serbia. It is located within Niš municipality of Crveni Krst. As of 2011, it had a population of 12,516, making it the largest neighborhood of the municipality.

Location
Crveni Krst is located in the central-west part of Niš. It is flat and bordered on the north by the neighborhood of Komren and on the south by Beograd Mala.

Characteristics
The neighborhood is mostly industrial.

Future development
City government reserved the area for industry development.

References 

Neighborhoods of Niš